The Queen of Moulin Rouge (German: Die Königin von Moulin Rouge) is a 1926 Austrian silent comedy film directed by Robert Wiene and starring Mady Christians, André Roanne and Livio Pavanelli. The film is based on the 1902 play La Duchesse des Folies-Bergères by Georges Feydeau. It was the final silent film Wiene made in Austria, before returning to Germany. It was made by the Austrian studio Pan Film, with backing from the French Pathé and German Filmhaus Bruckmann companies.

Synopsis
A young Prince in Paris for his education, inherits the throne when his father abdicates. But a clause in the constitution states that the new King needs to be sworn in by noon the following day or he will forfeit the throne. As the new King has already gone out for a night of carousing in Paris, those in charge of him set out to search all the nightclubs to find him while a rival group of conspirators do everything they can to try and prevent him being informed.

Cast
 Mady Christians as Die Herzogin 
 André Roanne as Sergius 
 Livio Pavanelli as Arnold 
 Ly Josyanne as Gräfin Slowikin 
 Karl Forest as Schuldirektor 
 Karl Günther as Graf Slowikin 
 Fritz Ley as Chopinet 
 Paul Ollivier as Herzog von Pitschenieff 
 Walter Varndal as Kirschbaum 
 Uly van Dayen as Floramye 
 Lee Goysanne   
 Paul Biensfeldt

References

Bibliography
 Jung, Uli & Schatzberg, Walter. Beyond Caligari: The Films of Robert Wiene. Berghahn Books, 1999.

External links

1926 films
Austrian silent feature films
Austrian comedy films
Films directed by Robert Wiene
Austrian films based on plays
Films based on works by Georges Feydeau
Films set in Paris
Austrian black-and-white films
1926 comedy films
Silent comedy films
1920s German-language films